Be:First (stylized in all caps) is a Japanese boy band formed and managed by BMSG and signed to B-ME. The group debuted on November 3, 2021, through the reality competition show The First, which is hosted by Sky-Hi.

Name

The group's name, Be:First, was chosen with the intention of "always aiming for the top", and Sky-Hi hopes that the group will "continue to respect and love the fact that others are number one at the same time as they continue to be number one themselves". Their official fandom name is Besty, which was coined by combining the first and last two letters of the group's name to mean bestie (best friend).

History

2021: Formation and debut

On April 2, the audition of The First started airing on Nippon Television Network's information program Sukkiri and online streaming service Hulu. On August 13, the group name and members were announced on the last episode of the audition program. On August 16, the group's digital pre-debut track, Shining One, was released

On the Billboard Japan chart released on August 25, their digital pre-debut track, "Shining One", made its first appearance at number one on the Download Songs, number two on the Streaming Songs, and number two on the overall Japan Hot 100. The song was also ranked number one on the Oricon Weekly Digital Single ranking on the same day, and ranked first on the Oricon Weekly Streaming ranking. This double crown is the first time in three months since BTS's "Butter" on May 31 that the same work has reached number one in both the weekly digital single and streaming rankings simultaneously.

Despite their pre-debut, Be:First performed on several TV programs, including NTV's Sukkiri (August 25) and Buzzrhythm 02 (September 10), NHK's Shibuya no Oto (September 11), and TV Tokyo's Premiere Melodix! (September 11). The group was also featured in the industry magazine Nikkei Entertainment. Be:First appeared on September 18 as the opening act at SuperSonic2021, a music festival held as an alternative event to Summer Sonic Festival, and gave their first performance in front of an audience.

2022–present: Be: 1
Be:First collaborated with Jonas Blue to release the Japanese version of "Don't Wake Me Up" on July 13, 2022. The group released their debut studio album Be: 1 on August 31, preceded by their first two singles, "Gifted", and "Bye-Good-Bye".

Members
Credits adapted from the official website.

 Sota
 Shunto
 Manato
 Ryuhei
 Junon
 Ryoki
 Leo

Discography

Studio albums

Singles

Promotional singles

Other charted songs

References

External links
 

Japanese boy bands
Japanese dance music groups
Japanese pop music groups